The  is a city tram station located in Imizu, Toyama Prefecture, Japan. The Takaoka Kidō Line and Shin-Minato Harbor Line meet at this station. The station's name was changed from Shin-Minato Station in March 1985.

Structure
Rokudōji Station has two side platforms serving a track each. The station is unmanned.

Surrounding area
Rokudōji Station is located just off Route 472, and is an important storage location for lumber and other materials. JFE Materials has an office near the station.

Adjacent stations

External links
六渡寺駅 (private site)
 

Railway stations in Toyama Prefecture